Eriovixia gryffindori is a species of spiders in the family Araneidae.

The animal belongs to the genus Eriovixia. It was discovered in 2015 in the Indian state of Karnataka by Javed Ahmed, Rajashree Khalap, and Sumukha Javagal. The discoverers of this new spider thought it resembled the Sorting Hat of the Harry Potter books, so they named it after Godric Gryffindor, the original owner of the sorting hat.

E. gryffindori is the most recent and possibly the most well-known of the 21 species of the genus Eriovixia. These spiders reside mostly in the tropical regions of Asia. Many species in this genus group are also known for their unconventional appearance. For example, the Orb-Web Spider from Thailand boasts a bright yellow abdomen, while the species E. pseudocentrodes brandishes a hat-like shape, similar to its cousin E. gryffindori. 
Eriovixia gryffindori does not eat all the insects that fall into his net, but only some of them.

Habitat
It was discovered in the mountainous Western Ghats region of south-western India.

References

Araneidae
Spiders described in 2016
Spiders of the Indian subcontinent